Zoran Knežević (Serbian Cyrillic: Зоран Кнежевић; born August 15, 1986) is a Serbian footballer who plays for Scarborough SC in the Canadian Soccer League.

Club career

Early career 
Knežević began playing in 2002 with FK Budućnost Valjevo in the Second League of Serbia and Montenegro, and in 2005 in the Serbian First League with FK BSK Borča. He would re-sign with Borča for the 2007-08 season.

Russia 
In the winter transfer window of 2007-08, he was acquired by Russian Premier League side FC Khimki. He appeared in one match against Dynamo Moscow on March 23, 2008. His tenure with Khimki lasted a single season and departed from the club after his contract wasn't renewed. After a season in Serbia, he returned to Russia in the winter of 2011 to play in the second tier with Gazovik Orenburg. In total, he would play in 14 matches and score one goal.

Serbia 
After his first stint in Russia, he returned to his former club Borca in 2009 where he played for two seasons in the country's top-tier league the Serbian SuperLiga. Following his second spell in Russia, he resumes his career in the Serbian top tier by signing with Sloboda Užice for the 2012-13 season. He would re-sign with Sloboda for another season however the club was relegated after the conclusion of the season. 

In 2015, he returned to the SuperLiga to sign with FK Jagodina. In his debut season with Jagodina, he appeared in 20 matches. Knežević departed from Jagodina after their relegation to the second tier. 

He returned to Europe in 2017 to play in the Serbian League West with Buducnost Valjevo. For the remainder of the 2017-18 season he played in the Montenegrin First League with OFK Grbalj.

Asia 
In 2014, he played abroad in the Iranian top tier the Persian Gulf Pro League with Padideh F.C. He would depart from the club the following season due to a pay dispute. He would appear in 25 matches for Padideh.  

In 2016, he returned to Asia to play in the Indonesia Soccer Championship with Bali United F.C.

Scarborough SC 
In 2018, Knežević played abroad in the southern Ontario-based Canadian Soccer League with Scarborough SC. In his debut season with the Toronto-based club, he contributed a goal in the opening round of the playoffs against Hamilton City which advanced Scarborough to the next round. Scarborough would ultimately reach the CSL Championship final where they were defeated in a penalty shootout by FC Vorkuta. He re-signed with Scarborough for the 2019 season where he assisted in securing the club's first championship title after defeating FC Ukraine United. The following season saw Scarborough claim their first divisional title after finishing first in the First Division. He made his fourth consecutive championship final appearance where Vorkuta defeated Scarborough. 

In 2021, he re-signed with the eastern Toronto side for his fourth season. Throughout the 2021 campaign, he appeared in the invitational tournament final the ProSound Cup against rivals Vorkuta where Scarborough was defeated in a penalty shootout. He won his second championship title by assisting Scarborough in defeating Vorkuta in the 2021 playoffs. He re-signed with Scarborough for the 2022 season. Throughout the 2022 campaign, the eastern Toronto side would achieve an 18-game undefeated streak and playoff position by finishing third. Knežević made his third championship appearance, which Scarborough lost to FC Continentals (formerly FC Vorkuta).

International career 
Knežević represented the Serbia national under-21 football team.

Honours 
Scarborough SC
 CSL Championship: 2019

References

External links
  Zoran Knežević at Soccerway

1986 births
Living people
Sportspeople from Valjevo
Serbian footballers
Serbian expatriate footballers
FC Khimki players
Shahr Khodro F.C. players
Russian Premier League players
Expatriate footballers in Russia
Expatriate footballers in Iran
Expatriate soccer players in Canada
FK Budućnost Valjevo players
FK BSK Borča players
FK Sloboda Užice players
FK Jagodina players
Serbian SuperLiga players
Association football midfielders
Serbian expatriate sportspeople in Iran
Serbian expatriate sportspeople in Russia
Canadian Soccer League (1998–present) players
Scarborough SC players
FC Orenburg players
Bali United F.C. players
OFK Grbalj players
Serbian First League players
Persian Gulf Pro League players
Montenegrin First League players
Serbian League players
Russian First League players